Hortipes is a genus of African corinnid sac spiders first described by J. Bosselaers & J.-C. Ledoux in 1998.

Species
 it contains seventy species:
H. abucoletus Bosselaers & Jocqué, 2000 – Cameroon
H. aelurisiepae Bosselaers & Jocqué, 2000 – South Africa
H. alderweireldti Bosselaers & Jocqué, 2000 – Equatorial Guinea
H. amphibolus Bosselaers & Jocqué, 2000 – Congo
H. anansiodatus Bosselaers & Jocqué, 2000 – Cameroon
H. angariopsis Bosselaers & Jocqué, 2000 – Tanzania
H. arboricola Ledoux & Emerit, 1998 – Gabon
H. architelones Bosselaers & Jocqué, 2000 – Cameroon
H. atalante Bosselaers & Jocqué, 2000 – South Africa
H. auriga Bosselaers & Jocqué, 2000 – Congo
H. aurora Bosselaers & Jocqué, 2000 – Congo
H. baerti Bosselaers & Jocqué, 2000 – Ivory Coast
H. bjorni Bosselaers & Jocqué, 2000 – Tanzania
H. bosmansi Bosselaers & Jocqué, 2000 – Cameroon
H. calliblepharus Bosselaers & Jocqué, 2000 – Cameroon
H. castor Bosselaers & Jocqué, 2000 – Tanzania
H. centralis Bosselaers & Jocqué, 2000 – Congo
H. chrysothemis Bosselaers & Jocqué, 2000 – Cameroon
H. coccinatus Bosselaers & Jocqué, 2000 – South Africa
H. contubernalis Bosselaers & Jocqué, 2000 – South Africa
H. creber Bosselaers & Jocqué, 2000 – Tanzania
H. cucurbita Bosselaers & Jocqué, 2000 – Tanzania
H. delphinus Bosselaers & Jocqué, 2000 – Tanzania
H. depravator Bosselaers & Jocqué, 2000 – Cameroon
H. echo Bosselaers & Jocqué, 2000 – Congo
H. exoptans Bosselaers & Jocqué, 2000 – Tanzania
H. falcatus Bosselaers & Jocqué, 2000 – Congo, Rwanda, Uganda
H. fastigiensis Bosselaers & Jocqué, 2000 – Tanzania
H. fortipes Bosselaers & Jocqué, 2000 – Equatorial Guinea
H. gigapophysalis Jocqué, Bosselaers & Henrard, 2012 – Guinea
H. griswoldi Bosselaers & Jocqué, 2000 – South Africa
H. hastatus Bosselaers & Jocqué, 2000 – Congo, Uganda
H. hesperoecius Bosselaers & Jocqué, 2000 – Sierra Leone
H. hormigricola Bosselaers & Jocqué, 2000 – Cameroon
H. horta Bosselaers & Jocqué, 2000 – Congo
H. hyakutake Bosselaers & Jocqué, 2000 – South Africa
H. irimus Bosselaers & Jocqué, 2000 – South Africa
H. klumpkeae Bosselaers & Jocqué, 2000 – Tanzania
H. lejeunei Bosselaers & Jocqué, 2000 – Congo, Rwanda
H. leno Bosselaers & Jocqué, 2000 – Tanzania
H. libidinosus Bosselaers & Jocqué, 2000 – Tanzania
H. licnophorus Bosselaers & Jocqué, 2000 – South Africa
H. limicola Ledoux & Emerit, 1998 – Gabon
H. luytenae Bosselaers & Ledoux, 1998 (type) – South Africa
H. machaeropolion Bosselaers & Jocqué, 2000 – Nigeria
H. marginatus Ledoux & Emerit, 1998 – Ivory Coast
H. merwei Bosselaers & Jocqué, 2000 – South Africa
H. mesembrinus Bosselaers & Jocqué, 2000 – South Africa
H. mulciber Bosselaers & Jocqué, 2000 – Tanzania
H. narcissus Bosselaers & Jocqué, 2000 – Congo
H. orchatocnemis Bosselaers & Jocqué, 2000 – Malawi
H. oronesiotes Bosselaers & Jocqué, 2000 – Malawi
H. ostiovolutus Bosselaers & Jocqué, 2000 – Tanzania
H. paludigena Ledoux & Emerit, 1998 – Gabon
H. penthesileia Bosselaers & Jocqué, 2000 – Malawi
H. platnicki Bosselaers & Jocqué, 2000 – Tanzania
H. pollux Bosselaers & Jocqué, 2000 – Malawi
H. puylaerti Bosselaers & Jocqué, 2000 – Cameroon
H. robertus Bosselaers & Jocqué, 2000 – Cameroon
H. rothorum Bosselaers & Jocqué, 2000 – South Africa
H. salticola Bosselaers & Jocqué, 2000 – Tanzania
H. sceptrum Bosselaers & Jocqué, 2000 – Cameroon
H. scharffi Bosselaers & Jocqué, 2000 – Tanzania
H. schoemanae Bosselaers & Jocqué, 2000 – South Africa
H. silvarum Ledoux & Emerit, 1998 – Ivory Coast
H. stoltzei Bosselaers & Jocqué, 2000 – Tanzania
H. tarachodes Bosselaers & Jocqué, 2000 – Congo
H. terminator Bosselaers & Jocqué, 2000 – Congo
H. wimmertensi Bosselaers & Jocqué, 2000 – South Africa
H. zombaensis Bosselaers & Jocqué, 2000 – Malawi

References

Araneomorphae genera
Corinnidae
Spiders of Africa